Como's Zoo was a Zoo in Como, Lombardy, northern Italy, created in 1937 and closed in 1988.

References 

Zoos in Italy
Parks in Lombardy
Zoos established in 1937
Zoos disestablished in 1998
Parks in Como
Former zoos